Gerard Melancon (born May 10, 1967 in Rayne, Louisiana) is an American jockey in Thoroughbred horse racing. On June 9, 2016 he won the 4,500th race of his career at Evangeline Downs in Opelousas, Louisiana.

References

Year-end charts

1967 births
Living people
American jockeys
Cajun jockeys
People from Rayne, Louisiana